Evans Sakala (born 10 October 1970) is a Zambian footballer. He played in 15 matches for the Zambia national football team in 1993 and 1994. He was also named in Zambia's squad for the 1994 African Cup of Nations tournament.

References

1970 births
Living people
Zambian footballers
Zambia international footballers
1994 African Cup of Nations players
Place of birth missing (living people)
Association footballers not categorized by position